Ventnor City School District is a community  public school district that serves students in pre-kindergarten through eighth grade from Ventnor City, in Atlantic County, New Jersey, United States. The district's motto is VECC: We Think Achievement.

As of the 2018–19 school year, the district, comprising two schools, had an enrollment of 684 students and 70.5 classroom teachers (on an FTE basis), for a student–teacher ratio of 9.7:1.

The district is classified by the New Jersey Department of Education as being in District Factor Group "B", the second lowest of eight groupings. District Factor Groups organize districts statewide to allow comparison by common socioeconomic characteristics of the local districts. From lowest socioeconomic status to highest, the categories are A, B, CD, DE, FG, GH, I and J.

Public school students in ninth through twelfth grades, along with those from Brigantine and Margate City, attend Atlantic City High School in neighboring Atlantic City, as part of a sending/receiving relationship with the Atlantic City School District that has existed since 1920. As of the 2018–19 school year, the high school had an enrollment of 1,796 students and 153.0 classroom teachers (on an FTE basis), for a student–teacher ratio of 11.7:1.

The Ventnor district has considered options for an alternative high school sending relationship.

Schools
The Ventnor City School District operates two schools for PreK-8 within the Ventnor Educational Community Complex. Schools in the district (with 2018–19 enrollment data from the National Center for Education Statistics) are:
Ventnor Elementary School with 376 students in grades PreK-5
Carmela Somershoe, Principal
Ventnor Middle School with 286 students in grades 6-8
Rob Baker, Principal

The original school was built in 1970, with renovations in 1974, 1997 and 2001.

Administration
Core members of the district's administration include:
Eileen Johnson, Superintendent
Terri Nowotny, Business Administrator / Board Secretary

Board of education
The district's board of education consists of seven members who set policy and oversee the fiscal and educational operation of the district through its administration. As a Type I school district, the board's trustees are appointed by the Mayor to serve three-year terms of office on a staggered basis, with either two or three members up for reappointment each year. Of the more than 600 school districts statewide, Ventnor City is one of 15 districts with appointed school districts.

References

External links
Ventnor Educational Community Complex
 
School Data for the Ventnor City School District, National Center for Education Statistics

Ventnor City, New Jersey
New Jersey District Factor Group B
School districts in Atlantic County, New Jersey